Pioneer is an unincorporated community in Noble Township, Wabash County, in the U.S. state of Indiana.

History

A post office was established at Pioneer in 1897, and remained in operation until it was discontinued in 1905.

Geography

References

Unincorporated communities in Wabash County, Indiana
Unincorporated communities in Indiana